Bob Dylan's Greatest Hits Vol. II, also known as More Bob Dylan Greatest Hits, is the second compilation album by American singer-songwriter Bob Dylan, released on November 17, 1971 by Columbia Records. With Dylan not expected to release any new material for an extended period of time, CBS Records president Clive Davis proposed issuing a double LP compilation of older material. Dylan agreed, compiling it himself and suggesting that the package include a full side of unreleased tracks from his archives. After submitting a set of excerpts from The Basement Tapes that Davis found unsatisfactory, Dylan returned to the studio in September 1971 to recut several Basement songs, with Happy Traum providing backup.

The final package included one previously uncollected single, "Watching the River Flow", an outtake from the same sessions, "When I Paint My Masterpiece"; one song from Dylan's April 12, 1963 Town Hall concert, "Tomorrow Is a Long Time", and three songs from the September sessions, "I Shall Be Released", "You Ain't Goin' Nowhere", and "Down in the Flood". The remaining tracks were drawn from existing releases.

In 2003, this album was released along with Dylan's two other Greatest Hits compilations in one four-disc set, as Greatest Hits Volumes I–III.

As with The Basement Tapes and the Beatles' 1962-1966, all the selections could fit on a single 80-minute CD, but were nevertheless released on two CDs to match the LP.

Artwork 
The album package was designed to capitalize on the publicity surrounding George Harrison's Concert for Bangladesh, about to be released as a film and album. The photograph on the album cover is a cropped version of a photo taken during Dylan's performance at the concert by the film's still photographer, Barry Feinstein.  The uncropped photo, which appeared as a two-page spread in the booklet included in the album Concert for Bangla Desh (sic), also contained George Harrison, who was standing to Dylan's right.  The album cover is similar to the previous volume, Bob Dylan's Greatest Hits, which utilized Rowland Scherman's 1965 photo. Reaching #14 in the US and #12 in the UK, Bob Dylan's Greatest Hits Vol. II is now certified five times platinum in the US, making it one of Dylan's best-selling albums.

Songs previously unreleased on LP 

"In one sense, 1971 and 1972 might both be considered 'lost' years," writes Dylan biographer Clinton Heylin. Neither year would produce an album, at least not an album entirely composed of newly recorded material.

Between March 16 and 19, 1971, Dylan reserved three days at Blue Rock Studios, a small studio in New York's Greenwich Village. According to Heylin, "These sessions were produced by Leon Russell of Mad Dogs and Englishmen fame. Only two originals were recorded—'Watching the River Flow' and 'When I Paint My Masterpiece'—but both confronted the same subject matter, a continuing dearth of inspiration, in a refreshingly honest fashion."

"When I Paint My Masterpiece" was also recorded by The Band, who would release their version first on Cahoots. Dylan's recording from Blue Rock would only see release on Bob Dylan's Greatest Hits Vol. II.

"Watching the River Flow" was issued as a single in June 1971, backed by "Spanish Is the Loving Tongue", which had been recorded during the New Morning sessions.

Months later, Dylan would agree to release a second "greatest hits" compilation, provided he could compile it himself, issue it as a double album, and include several older compositions which he had written but never issued himself. To accommodate this last condition, Dylan took it upon himself to hold a recording session at Columbia's Recording Studios in New York. On September 24, 1971, in Columbia's Studio B, Dylan recorded four songs with his friend, Happy Traum.

"He felt there were some songs that he had written that had become hits of sorts for other people, that he didn't actually perform himself," recalls Traum, "and he wanted to fit those on the record as well...So we just went in one afternoon and did it, it was just the two of us and the engineer, and it was very simple...we chose three [songs] on the spot and mixed them...in the space of an afternoon...Sometimes I wasn't even sure if it was a final take until we would just finish and Bob would say, 'Okay, let's go and mix it.'"

"Crash On The Levee (Down In The Flood)", "You Ain't Going Nowhere" and "I Shall Be Released" were recorded and selected for the compilation. "Only a Hobo", an early composition dating back to 1963, was also considered for inclusion but ultimately was left unreleased until 2013's The Bootleg Series Vol. 10 – Another Self Portrait (1969–1971).

A few lyrical revisions were made on "You Ain't Going Nowhere", the most notable being a reference to Roger McGuinn. "Pack up your money, pull up your tent McGuinn, you ain't going nowhere". McGuinn's band, The Byrds, had successfully recorded "You Ain't Going Nowhere" on their landmark album, Sweetheart of the Rodeo, and they even issued their recording as a single. Country musician Marty Stuart has also recorded this song. According to McGuinn in the liner notes to the 1997 reissue of Sweetheart of the Rodeo, Dylan singled him out in these lyrics for bungling Dylan's original Basement Tapes lyrics on the Byrds version of the song in which McGuinn sings "Pack up your money / Pick up your tent" instead of "Pick up your money / Pack up your tent" as Dylan had.

The previously unreleased "Tomorrow Is a Long Time" was also included, with the track taken from a recording of Dylan's April 12, 1963 Town Hall concert.

Other notable releases recorded in 1971 

In addition to the material added to Bob Dylan's Greatest Hits Vol. II, Dylan recorded a single, "George Jackson." An incarcerated black activist, George Jackson died on August 21, 1971. After reading a newspaper article about his death, Dylan quickly wrote an elegy for Jackson and rushed a small band into Blue Rock Studios to record it the following day. He recorded two versions, one following a simple acoustic arrangement, another with a full-band arrangement. Dylan also recorded another original composition, the country-flavored "Wallflower". Both versions of "George Jackson" were issued on the two sides of a single released on November 12, 1971. The single penetrated the Top 40, peaking at #33 on the Billboard Hot 100. The "Wallflower" recording was set aside and would later be released on The Bootleg Series Volumes 1-3 (Rare & Unreleased) 1961-1991, but was recorded, with Dylan's backing vocal, for Doug Sahm's 1973 recording Doug Sahm and Band.

Dylan gave three significant concert performances in 1971, which were professionally recorded and eventually released.

The first two came on August 1, at Madison Square Garden for a benefit concert organized by George Harrison. Dylan was not scheduled to perform, but Harrison convinced him to make a surprise appearance. Dylan performed a set at both the afternoon and evening shows, backed by Harrison on lead guitar, Leon Russell on bass, and Ringo Starr on tambourine. A selection of his performances was issued on the Grammy-winning The Concert for Bangladesh, issued on December 20, 1971.

The third and final performance actually came during the first hour of 1972, when he made a surprise appearance at The Band's New Year's Eve concert at New York's Academy of Music. Dylan appeared sometime after midnight and performed four songs backed by The Band: "Crash on the Levee (Down in the Flood)", "When I Paint My Masterpiece", "Don't Ya Tell Henry" and "Like a Rolling Stone". Clinton Heylin would later describe Dylan's appearance as "a return to some approximation of peak performing powers." The concert was recorded by Phil Ramone and later mixed and compiled as The Band's Rock of Ages. However, Dylan's set would have to wait until May 2001 for official release, when it was included as part of an expanded, remastered CD edition of Rock of Ages.

Track listing
The UK edition has a different tracklist from that given below. "Positively 4th Street" replaces "She Belongs to Me" as the first track on disc two. ("Positively 4th Street" was missing from the 1967 UK Bob Dylan's Greatest Hits, where "She Belongs to Me" replaced it.) On side four, "It's All Over Now, Baby Blue", which had also appeared on the 1967 UK Greatest Hits album as one of the two extra tracks, is replaced by "New Morning" as track 2.

References

External links 
 

1971 greatest hits albums
Albums produced by Bob Johnston
Albums produced by John Hammond (producer)
Albums produced by Tom Wilson (record producer)
Bob Dylan compilation albums
Columbia Records compilation albums
Albums produced by Leon Russell